The 1983–84 BHL season was the second season the British Hockey League. This season saw the introduction of the Premier League and First Division format that would continue until the disbandment of the British Hockey League in 1996. Nine of the fifteen teams which had taken part the previous season joined the Premier League.

The 1983–84 season also saw the reintroduction of the Autumn Cup and the first season of sponsorship by Heineken.

Kohler Engines Autumn Cup

Scotland

In Scotland the winner of the group stage automatically progressed to the final.

England
English clubs were divided into two groups; North and South. The winner of each group would play an English Final, the winner going on to play in the final.

Group stage

English final

Streatham Redskins 10-3 Durham Wasps

Final
The final was played at Streatham Ice Rink.

Dundee Rockets 6-6 Streatham Redskins (Dundee win after penalty shots)

League

Playoffs

The top six teams entered the playoffs. They were divided into two groups of three. Group A was made up of Dundee, Streatham and Murrayfield while Group B was made up of Durham, Ayr and Whitley. The top two sides in each group advanced to next round. The semi finals and final were played over a single weekend at Wembley Arena.

Group A

Group B

Semi-finals
Semi-final A: Winner A (Murrayfield) vs Runner Up B (Ayr)
Murrayfield Racers 5-4 Ayr Bruins

Semi-final B: Winner B (Durham) vs Runner Up A (Dundee)
Durham Wasps 8-10 Dundee Rockets

Final
Dundee Rockets 5-4 Murrayfield Racers

References

1
United
British Hockey League seasons